The following is a complete list of symphonies by Christoph Graupner (1683–1760), the German harpsichordist and composer of high Baroque music.  The works appear as given in Thematishces Verzeichnis Der Musikalischen Werke:Graupner, Christoph (thematic catalogue of Graupner's instrumental works).

List of symphonies
 GWV 501 — Symphony in C major for 2 horns, 2 violins, viola, basso. Darmstadt Library Shelf Number: 470/031
 GWV 502 — Symphony in C major for 2 horns, 2 violins, viola, basso. Darmstadt Library Shelf Number: 470/032
 GWV 503 — Symphony in C major for 2 horns, 2 violins, viola, basso. Darmstadt Library Shelf Number: 470/077
 GWV 504 — Symphony in C major for 2 horns, 2 violins, viola, basso. Darmstadt Library Shelf Number: 470/078
 GWV 505 — Symphony in C major for 2 horns, 2 violins, viola, basso. Darmstadt Library Shelf Number: 470/079
 GWV 506 — Symphony in C major for 2 horns, 2 violins, viola, basso. Darmstadt Library Shelf Number: 470/080
 GWV 507 — Symphony in C major for 2 horns, 2 violins, viola, basso. Darmstadt Library Shelf Number: 470/081
 GWV 508 — Symphony in C major for 2 horns, 2 violins, viola, basso. Darmstadt Library Shelf Number: 470/083
 GWV 509 — Symphony in C major for 2 horns, 2 violins, viola, basso. Darmstadt Library Shelf Number: 470/085
 GWV 510 — Symphony in C major for 2 flutes, 2 horns, 2 violins, viola, basso. Darmstadt Library Shelf Number: 470/043
 GWV 511 — Symphony in D major for 2 trumpets, 2 violins, viola, basso. Darmstadt Library Shelf Number: 470/048
 GWV 512 — Symphony in D major for 2 horns, 2 violins, viola, basso. Darmstadt Library Shelf Number: 470/021
 GWV 513 — Symphony in D major for 2 horns, 2 violins, viola, basso. Darmstadt Library Shelf Number: 470/023
 GWV 514 — Symphony in D major for 2 horns, 2 violins, viola, basso. Darmstadt Library Shelf Number: 470/033
 GWV 515 — Symphony in D major for 2 horns, 2 violins, viola, basso. Darmstadt Library Shelf Number: 470/061
 GWV 516 — Symphony in D major for 2 horns, 2 violins, viola, basso. Darmstadt Library Shelf Number: 470/063
 GWV 517 — Symphony in D major for 2 horns, 2 violins, viola, basso. Darmstadt Library Shelf Number: 470/076
 GWV 518 — Symphony in D major for 2 horns, 2 violins, viola, basso. Darmstadt Library Shelf Number: 470/082
 GWV 519 — Symphony in D major for 2 horns, 2 violins, viola, basso. Darmstadt Library Shelf Number: 470/086
 GWV 520 — Symphony in D major for 2 trumpets, 4 timpani, 2 violins, viola, basso. Darmstadt Library Shelf Number: 470/005
 GWV 521 — Symphony in D major for 2 trumpets, 2 timpani, 2 violins, viola, basso. Darmstadt Library Shelf Number: 470/010
 GWV 522 — Symphony in D major for 2 trumpets, 2 timpani, 2 violins, viola, basso. Darmstadt Library Shelf Number: 470/049
 GWV 523 — Symphony in D major for 2 trumpets, 4 timpani, 2 violins, viola, basso. Darmstadt Library Shelf Number: 470/050
 GWV 524 — Symphony in D major for 2 trumpets, 4 timpani, 2 violins, viola, basso. Darmstadt Library Shelf Number: 470/051
 GWV 525 — Symphony in D major for 2 trumpets, 2 timpani, 2 violins, viola, basso. Darmstadt Library Shelf Number: 470/055
 GWV 526 — Symphony in D major for 2 trumpets, 4 timpani, 2 violins, viola, basso. Darmstadt Library Shelf Number: 470/092
 GWV 527 — Symphony in D major for 2 trumpets, 4 timpani, 2 violins, viola, basso. Darmstadt Library Shelf Number: 470/093
 GWV 528 — Symphony in D major for 2 trumpets, 4 timpani, 2 violins, viola, basso. Darmstadt Library Shelf Number: 470/094
 GWV 529 — Symphony in D major for 2 trumpets, 4 timpani, 2 violins, viola, basso. Darmstadt Library Shelf Number: 470/095
 GWV 530 — Symphony in D major for 2 horns, 4 timpani, 2 violins, viola, basso. Darmstadt Library Shelf Number: 470/007
 GWV 531 — Symphony in D major for 2 horns, 2 timpani, 2 violins, viola, basso. Darmstadt Library Shelf Number: 470/022
 GWV 532 — Symphony in D major for 2 horns, 4 timpani, 2 violins, viola, basso. Darmstadt Library Shelf Number: 470/024
 GWV 533 — Symphony in D major for 2 horns, 4 timpani, 2 violins, viola, basso. Darmstadt Library Shelf Number: 470/034
 GWV 534 — Symphony in D major for 2 horns, 2 timpani, 2 violins, viola, basso. Darmstadt Library Shelf Number: 470/035
 GWV 535 — Symphony in D major for 2 flutes, 2 horns, 2 violins, viola, basso. Darmstadt Library Shelf Number: 470/040
 GWV 536 — Symphony in D major for 2 flutes, 2 horns, 2 violins, viola, basso. Darmstadt Library Shelf Number: 470/089
 GWV 537 — Symphony in D major for 2 flutes, 2 horns, 2 violins, viola, basso. Darmstadt Library Shelf Number: 470/107
 GWV 538 — Symphony in D major for 2 flutes, 2 horns, 2 violins, viola, basso. Darmstadt Library Shelf Number: 470/110
 GWV 539 — Symphony in D major for 2 flutes, 2 horns, 2 violins, viola, basso. Darmstadt Library Shelf Number: 470/111
 GWV 540 — Symphony in D major for 2 trumpets, 2 horns, 4 timpani, 2 violins, viola, basso. Darmstadt Library Shelf Number: 470/011
 GWV 541 — Symphony in D major for 2 trumpets, 2 horns, 4 timpani, 2 violins, viola, basso. Darmstadt Library Shelf Number: 470/012
 GWV 542 — Symphony in D major for 2 trumpets, 2 horns, 4 timpani, 2 violins, viola, basso. Darmstadt Library Shelf Number: 470/053
 GWV 543 — Symphony in D major for 2 trumpets, 2 horns, 4 timpani, 2 violins, viola, basso. Darmstadt Library Shelf Number: 470/054
 GWV 544 — Symphony in D major for 2 trumpets, 2 horns, 4 timpani, 2 violins, viola, basso. Darmstadt Library Shelf Number: 470/056
 GWV 545 — Symphony in D major for 2 trumpets, 2 flutes, 4 timpani, 2 violins, viola, basso. Darmstadt Library Shelf Number: 470/098
 GWV 546 — Symphony in D major for 2 flutes, 2 horns, 2 violins, viola, basso. Darmstadt Library Shelf Number: 470/045
 GWV 547 — Symphony in D major for 2 flutes, 2 horns, 4 timpani, 2 violins, viola, basso. Darmstadt Library Shelf Number: 470/044
 GWV 548 — Symphony in D major for 2 flutes, 2 horns, 4 timpani, 2 violins, viola, basso. Darmstadt Library Shelf Number: 470/047
 GWV 549 — Symphony in D major for 2 trumpets, 2 flutes, 2 horns, 4 timpani, 2 violins, viola, basso. Darmstadt Library Shelf Number: 470/052
 GWV 550 — Symphony in D major for 2 trumpets, 2 flutes, 2 horns, 4 timpani, 2 violins, viola, basso. Darmstadt Library Shelf Number: 470/067
 GWV 551 — Symphony in D major for 2 trumpets, 2 flutes, 2 horns, 4 timpani, 2 violins, viola, basso. Darmstadt Library Shelf Number: 470/068
 GWV 552 — Symphony in D major for 2 trumpets, 2 flutes, 2 horns, 4 timpani, 2 violins, viola, basso. Darmstadt Library Shelf Number: 470/069
 GWV 553 — Symphony in D major for 2 trumpets, 2 flutes, 2 horns, 4 timpani, 2 violins, viola, basso. Darmstadt Library Shelf Number: 470/070
 GWV 554 — Symphony in D major for 2 trumpets, 2 flutes, 2 horns, 4 timpani, 2 violins, viola, basso. Darmstadt Library Shelf Number: 470/097
 GWV 555 — Symphony in D major for 2 trumpets, 2 flutes, 2 horns, 4 timpani, 2 violins, viola, basso. Darmstadt Library Shelf Number: 470/113
 GWV 556 — Symphony in D major for 2 trumpets, 2 flutes, 2 horns, 4 timpani, 2 violins, viola, basso. Darmstadt Library Shelf Number: 470/096
 GWV 557 — Symphony in E Flat Major for 2 horns, 2 violins, viola, basso. Darmstadt Library Shelf Number: 470/025
 GWV 558 — Symphony in E Flat Major for 2 horns, 4 timpani, 2 violins, viola, basso. Darmstadt Library Shelf Number: 470/026
 GWV 559 — Symphony in E Flat Major for 2 horns, 4 timpani, 2 violins, viola, basso. Darmstadt Library Shelf Number: 470/027
 GWV 560 — Symphony in E Flat Major for 2 flutes, 2 horns, 2 violins, viola, basso. Darmstadt Library Shelf Number: 470/041
 GWV 561 — Symphony in E Flat Major for 2 flutes, 2 horns, 2 violins, viola, basso. Darmstadt Library Shelf Number: 470/042
 GWV 562 — Symphony in E Major for 2 flutes, 2 horns, 2 violins, viola, basso. Darmstadt Library Shelf Number: 470/088
 GWV 563 — Symphony in F Major for 2 horns, 2 violins, viola, basso. Darmstadt Library Shelf Number: 470/028
 GWV 564 — Symphony in F Major for 2 horns, 2 violins, viola, basso. Darmstadt Library Shelf Number: 470/029
 GWV 565 — Symphony in F Major for 2 trumpets, 3 timpani, 2 violins, viola, basso. Darmstadt Library Shelf Number: 470/009
 GWV 566 — Symphony in F Major for 2 horns, 6 timpani, 2 violins, viola, basso. Darmstadt Library Shelf Number: 470/008
 GWV 567 — Symphony in F Major for 2 horns, 4 timpani, 2 violins, viola, basso. Darmstadt Library Shelf Number: 470/030
 GWV 568 — Symphony in F Major for 2 flutes, 2 horns, 2 violins, viola, basso. Darmstadt Library Shelf Number: 470/064
 GWV 569 — Symphony in F Major for 2 flutes, 2 horns, 2 violins, viola, basso. Darmstadt Library Shelf Number: 470/065
 GWV 570 — Symphony in F Major for 2 flutes, 2 horns, 2 violins, viola, basso. Darmstadt Library Shelf Number: 470/066
 GWV 571 — Symphony in F Major for 2 flutes, 2 horns, 2 violins, viola, basso. Darmstadt Library Shelf Number: 470/108
 GWV 572 — Symphony in F Major for 2 flutes, 2 horns, 2 violins, viola, basso. Darmstadt Library Shelf Number: 470/109
 GWV 573 — Symphony in F Major for 2 flutes, 2 horns, 2 violins, viola, basso. Darmstadt Library Shelf Number: 470/112
 GWV 574 — Symphony in F Major for 2 horns, 2 violettas, 2 violins, viola, basso. Darmstadt Library Shelf Number: 470/101
 GWV 575 — Symphony in F Major for 2 horns, 2 violettas, 2 violins, viola, basso. Darmstadt Library Shelf Number: 470/102
 GWV 576 — Symphony in F Major for 2 flutes, 2 horns, 4 timpani, 2 violins, viola, basso. Darmstadt Library Shelf Number: 470/090
 GWV 577 — Symphony in F Major for viola d'amore, bassoon, cello, 3 violas, basso. Darmstadt Library Shelf Number: 470/003
 GWV 578 — Symphony in G major for 2 horns, 2 violins, viola, basso. Darmstadt Library Shelf Number: 470/014
 GWV 579 — Symphony in G major for 2 horns, 2 violins, viola, basso. Darmstadt Library Shelf Number: 470/015
 GWV 580 — Symphony in G major for 2 horns, 2 violins, viola, basso. Darmstadt Library Shelf Number: 470/016
 GWV 581 — Symphony in G major for 2 horns, 2 violins, viola, basso. Darmstadt Library Shelf Number: 470/019
 GWV 582 — Symphony in G major for 2 horns, 2 violins, viola, basso. Darmstadt Library Shelf Number: 470/020
 GWV 583 — Symphony in G major for 2 horns, 2 violins, viola, basso. Darmstadt Library Shelf Number: 470/036
 GWV 584 — Symphony in G major for 2 horns, 2 violins, viola, basso. Darmstadt Library Shelf Number: 470/037
 GWV 585 — Symphony in G major for 2 horns, 2 violins, viola, basso. Darmstadt Library Shelf Number: 470/057
 GWV 586 — Symphony in G major for 2 horns, 2 violins, viola, basso. Darmstadt Library Shelf Number: 470/058
 GWV 587 — Symphony in G major for 2 horns, 2 violins, viola, basso. Darmstadt Library Shelf Number: 470/059
 GWV 588 — Symphony in G Major for 2 horns, 2 violins, viola, basso. Darmstadt Library Shelf Number: 470/059
 GWV 589 — Symphony in G Major for 2 horns, 2 violins, viola, basso. Darmstadt Library Shelf Number: 470/071
 GWV 590 — Symphony in G Major for 2 horns, 2 violins, viola, basso. Darmstadt Library Shelf Number: 470/072
 GWV 591 — Symphony in G Major for 2 horns, 2 violins, viola, basso. Darmstadt Library Shelf Number: 470/073
 GWV 592 — Symphony in G Major for 2 horns, 2 violins, viola, basso. Darmstadt Library Shelf Number: 470/074
 GWV 593 — Symphony in G Major for 2 horns, 2 violins, viola, basso. Darmstadt Library Shelf Number: 470/075
 GWV 594 — Symphony in G Major for 2 horns, 2 violins, viola, basso. Darmstadt Library Shelf Number: 470/084
 GWV 595 — Symphony in G Major for 2 horns, 2 violins, viola, basso. Darmstadt Library Shelf Number: 470/103
 GWV 596 — Symphony in G Major for 2 horns, 2 timpani, 2 violins, viola, basso. Darmstadt Library Shelf Number: 470/001
 GWV 597 — Symphony in G Major for 2 horns, 2 timpani, 2 violins, viola, basso. Darmstadt Library Shelf Number: 470/002
 GWV 598 — Symphony in G Major for 2 horns, 4 timpani, 2 violins, viola, basso. Darmstadt Library Shelf Number: 470/006
 GWV 599 — Symphony in G Major for 2 horns, 4 timpani, 2 violins, viola, basso. Darmstadt Library Shelf Number: 470/018
 GWV 600 — Symphony in G Major for 2 flutes, 2 horns,  2 violins, viola, basso. Darmstadt Library Shelf Number: 470/038
 GWV 601 — Symphony in G Major for 2 flutes, 2 horns,  2 violins, viola, basso. Darmstadt Library Shelf Number: 470/039
 GWV 602 — Symphony in G Major for 2 flutes, 2 horns,  2 violins, viola, basso. Darmstadt Library Shelf Number: 470/046
 GWV 603 — Symphony in G Major for 2 flutes, 2 horns,  2 violins, viola, basso. Darmstadt Library Shelf Number: 470/087
 GWV 604 — Symphony in G Major for 2 flutes, 2 horns,  2 violins, viola, basso. Darmstadt Library Shelf Number: 470/091
 GWV 605 — Symphony in G Major for 2 flutes, 2 horns,  2 violins, viola, basso. Darmstadt Library Shelf Number: 470/104
 GWV 606 — Symphony in G Major for 2 flutes, 2 horns, 2 violins, viola, basso. Darmstadt Library Shelf Number: 470/105
 GWV 607 — Symphony in G Major for 2 horns, 2 violettas, 2 violins, viola, basso. Darmstadt Library Shelf Number: 470/099
 GWV 608 — Symphony in G Major for 2 horns, 2 violettas, 2 violins, viola, basso. Darmstadt Library Shelf Number: 470/100
 GWV 609 — Symphony in G Major for 2 flutes, 2 horns, 4 timpani, 2 violins, viola, basso. Darmstadt Library Shelf Number: 470/106
 GWV 610 — Symphony in G Major for 2 flutes, 2 horns, 4 timpani, 2 violins, viola, basso. Darmstadt Library Shelf Number: 470/004
 GWV 611 — Symphony in G Major for 2 flutes, 2 horns, 2 bassoons, 5 timpani, 2 violettas, 2 violins, viola, basso. Darmstadt Library Shelf Number: 470/013
 GWV 612 — Symphony in A Major for 2 horns, 2 timpani, 2 violins, viola, basso. Darmstadt Library Shelf Number: 470/017
 GWV 730 — Symphony in D Major for 2 trumpets, 2 flutes, 2 horns, 2 violins, viola, basso. Darmstadt Library Shelf Number: 470/062

See also
 List of cantatas by Christoph Graupner
 List of harpsichord pieces by Christoph Graupner
 List of orchestral suites by Christoph Graupner
 List of concertos by Christoph Graupner
 List of chamber pieces by Christoph Graupner

Selected discography
 Graupner: Orchestral Works. Nova Stravaganza. Siegbert Rampe conductor (MD+G Gold 34111212)
 Graupner: Ouvertures and Cantata. Das Kliene Konzert. Hermann Max conductor. (CPO 999592)
 Graupner: Ouverture, Trio, Sinfonia. Nova Stravaganza. Siegbert Rampe conductor. (MD+G Gold 3411252)

References

External links
Graupner GWV-online a digital Graupner Werkverzeichnis with integrated search function
The Christoph Graupner Society Homepage
Extensive online bibliography for research on Christoph Graupner
ULB Library  Graupner's music manuscripts and archives in Darmstadt, Germany
Kim Patrick Clow's webpage dedicated to promoting Graupner's work.

Symphonies
Graupner, Christoph